The Mettie Airstrip , formerly the Selah Airstrip, is a small military airstrip located on the Yakima Training Center (YTC) with a single runway of about  in length and  in width. It was built by various elements of the 864th Engineer Battalion from Ft. Lewis WA in the summer of 1976.

References

Airports in Washington (state)
United States Army airfields
Transportation buildings and structures in Yakima County, Washington
Airfields of the United States Army Air Forces in Washington (state)